CJMV-FM is a Canadian radio station, broadcasting at 102.7 FM in Val-d'Or, Quebec. The station, branded as Énergie 102.7, airs a francophone mainstream rock format.

The majority of the station's schedule is simulcasted with its sister station in Rouyn-Noranda, CJMM-FM.

The station opened in Val-d'Or as an FM station in 1989, one of the 30 FM stations that opened in Québec in the 1980s.

History 

On July 10 1987, the Canadian Radio-television and Telecommunications Commission approved an application for broadcasting in the region at frequency 102.7 MHz with an effective radiated power of 49,400 watts. In 1988, it was approved to increase effective radiated power to 63,100 watts, and the station signed on the air on 17 June 1988.

The station has been affiliated with IHeartRadio since at least 2016. The genres it broadcasts include Adult contemporary music, Classic hits, Popular music, Rnb, skirt, talk, and top 40.

Previous logos

References

External links
 Énergie 102.7
 
 

Jmv
Jmv
Jmv
Jmv
Radio stations established in 1987
1987 establishments in Quebec